OPG may refer to:

Osteoprotegerin
Office of the Public Guardian (disambiguation)
Office of HM Paymaster General
Online Policy Group
Ontario Power Generation
 Open Government Partnership
Optical parametric generator
Orthopantomograph, a panoramic radiograph
 Orthopantogram or Panoramic radiograph